Oaxaca cheese, also known as quesillo and queso de hebra, is a white, semihard, low-fat cheese that originated in Mexico. It is similar to unaged Monterey Jack, but with a texture similar to mozzarella or string cheese.

History
It is named after the state of Oaxaca in southern Mexico, where it was first made. The string cheese process was brought to Mexico by the Dominican friars that settled in Oaxaca. The cheese is available in several different shapes.

The name "quesillo" is the one given by the region where it originated, then it adopted the name of Oaxaca cheese, the only real difference lies in where this dairy product was produced or where it is purchased, but in essence it is the same thing. However, there are those who believe that it would be better to keep the name Oaxaca cheese because this denomination would make this state famous outside the country and, like manchego cheese, gouda cheese or others, the name would be associated with a specific place.

Production
The production process is complicated and involves stretching the cheese into long ribbons and rolling it up like a ball of yarn using the pasta filata process. Another cheese made with this method is mozzarella curd, though the final process for Oaxaca cheese bears a closer resemblance to braided cheeses.

Uses
Queso Oaxaca is used widely in Mexican cuisine, especially in quesadillas and empanadas, where the queso Oaxaca is melted and other ingredients, such as huitlacoche and squash flowers, are added to the filling.

Outside Mexico
Oaxaca cheese is often confused with asadero (queso asadero), a cheese produced in the northern state of Chihuahua. They are similar in texture, but they are produced with different methods, making Oaxaca cheese moister.

The name is due to the similarity to the stringy consistency of heart of palm (palmito), and it is produced in the San Carlos and Zarcero cantons of Alajuela Province. 

In Nicaragua, Honduras and El Salvador, the cheese is known as quesillo.

Gallery

See also

 Cheeses of Mexico
 List of stretch-curd cheeses
 Oaxacan cuisine

References

Further reading

External links
 

Cow's-milk cheeses
Stretched-curd cheeses
Mexican cheeses
Oaxacan cuisine
Nicaraguan cheeses
Salvadoran cuisine